"Shooting Star" is a single by English indie rock band Air Traffic. It was the second single to be released from the band's debut album, Fractured Life. It was released on 18 June 2007 and reached a peak position of #30 in the UK Singles Chart.

The track was also used in the opening credits of MTV reality show Living on the Edge, the UK advert for Davidoff Cool Water and YouTube reality show The Suburbs. It has also been used in an introduction movie for the Phantom Coupe on the Rolls-Royce Motorcars website . It has also featured in the latest promotional video for UK based power distribution operator UK Power Networks.

Charts

Track listing
CD
"Shooting Star" (4:08)
"This Old Town" (3:38)
"Left Out In the Rain" (2:54)
"Shooting Star" (4:08)

Alternative covers

2007 singles
Air Traffic songs
2007 songs